Semenovia is a genus of flowering plants belonging to the family Apiaceae. It is in subfamily Apioideae and also tribe Tordylieae subtribe Tordyliinae.

Its native range is from Iran to Central Asia (within Afghanistan, Kazakhstan, Kyrgyzstan, Pakistan, Tajikistan, Tibet, Turkmenistan, Uzbekistan and the Western Himalayas) and China. 

The genus name of Semenovia is in honour of Pyotr Semyonov-Tyan-Shansky (1827–1914), a Russian geographer and statistician who managed the Russian Geographical Society for more than 40 years. He gained international fame for his pioneering exploration of the Tian Shan mountains. 
It was first described and published  in Bull. Soc. Imp. Naturalistes Moscou Vol.39 (II) on page 78 in 1866.

Known species
According to Kew, about 30 known species:

Semenovia alaica 
Semenovia bucharica 
Semenovia dasycarpa 
Semenovia dichotoma 
Semenovia dissectifolia 
Semenovia eriocarpa 
Semenovia frigida 
Semenovia furcata 
Semenovia glabrior 
Semenovia gyirongensis 
Semenovia heracleifolia 
Semenovia heterodonta 
Semenovia imbricata 
Semenovia lasiocarpa 
Semenovia macrocarpa 
Semenovia malcolmii 
Semenovia pamirica 
Semenovia pimpinellioides 
Semenovia propinqua 
Semenovia pulvinata 
Semenovia radiata 
Semenovia rubtzovii 
Semenovia subscaposa 
Semenovia suffruticosa 
Semenovia thomsonii 
Semenovia tragioides 
Semenovia transiliensis 
Semenovia vachanica 
Semenovia vaginata 
Semenovia zaprjagaevii

References

Apiaceae
Apiaceae genera
Plants described in 1845
Flora of Central Asia
Flora of Iran
Flora of Afghanistan
Flora of North-Central China
Flora of Qinghai
Flora of South-Central China
Flora of Tibet
Flora of Xinjiang
Flora of West Himalaya
[[